Talebabad (also Romanized as Ţālebābād) is a village in Qaleh Now Rural District, Qaleh Now District, Ray County, Tehran Province, Iran. At the 2006 census, its population was 2,530, in 616 families.

References 

Populated places in Ray County, Iran